Huangshan Station is a metro station of Line 1 of the Fuzhou Metro. It is located on Fuxia Road, south of Fuzhou-Quanzhou Express Link in Cangshan District, Fuzhou, Fujian, China. It started operation on May 18, 2016.

Station layout 

Source:

Exits

Source:

References 

Fuzhou Metro stations
Railway stations in China opened in 2016